"Thnks fr th Mmrs" (a disemvoweling of "Thanks for the Memories") is a song by American rock band Fall Out Boy. The song debuted on radio on March 20, 2007, and was released on March 27 as the third single from their third studio album, Infinity on High. With music composed by Patrick Stump and the lyrics penned by bassist Pete Wentz, the song was one of the two tracks produced by Babyface for the album.

"Thnks fr th Mmrs" was a commercial success, reaching No. 11 on the Billboard Hot 100 in the United States, and became the band's highest charting and most popular single in Australia at No. 3 on the ARIA charts. It was certified Gold by the Recording Industry Association of America (RIAA) for shipments of 500,000 units, and Platinum in Australia for shipments of 70,000 copies. The song went 2× Platinum in the US in December 2009, becoming another two-million seller for the band, along the lines of their earlier single "Sugar, We're Goin Down" from their previous 2005 album From Under the Cork Tree. "Thnks fr th Mmrs" became a staple at the band's concerts, interview performances and radio, being one of the band's most recognized singles.

Overview
In an interview with Genius, bassist Pete Wentz explained that the song revolves around the theme of a broken relationship, but also contains critical commentary towards society's obsession with fame.

The title, "Thnks fr th Mmrs" is the words "thanks for the memories" after having been disemvowelled. The title's removal of vowels comes as a facetious nod at Fall Out Boy's record company, who had asked them to shorten their often verbose song titles. The line that appears near the end of each chorus, "He tastes like you, only sweeter", is a line from the play and film Closer.

The song is featured in a Track Pack for Band Hero and Guitar Hero 5, and also available for DLC on the video game series Lips, Rocksmith, Rock Band 3 and Beat Saber. It is also featured on the game Boogie Superstar for the Wii.

Chart performance
The song peaked outside of the top 10 at No. 11 on the U.S. Billboard Hot 100, nine places lower than previous single "This Ain't a Scene, It's an Arms Race". It was later certified Gold by the Recording Industry Association of America (RIAA), denoting the shipment of 500,000 copies, although it is eligible for a double platinum certification, having sold 2,527,000 copies in the US as of February 2014. The song also peaked at No. 19 the U.S. Modern Rock Tracks and No. 13 on the Mainstream Top 40.

In Australia, "Thnks fr th Mmrs" reached a peak of No. 3 on the ARIA chart, after initially peaking at No. 4, making it the band's highest charting song in that region and the second top 10 hit single from Infinity on High there. It was certified Platinum by the Australian Recording Industry Association (ARIA) for the shipment of 70,000 units. In the UK, the track peaked at No. 12, making it another top 20 hit for the band there. Since 2007, "Thnks fr th Mmrs" has sold over 200,000 copies to date becoming one of the band's biggest selling singles in the UK. In New Zealand, the song placed at No. 11. In Ireland the track came in at No. 17.

Music video
The music video opens with Patrick Stump and Pete Wentz talking before filming it. Patrick asks Pete if he is sure about something; Pete replies, "Patrick, the guy's a visionary." The song then starts up, and suddenly, a chimpanzee yells "Cut!" and calls the band a "joke", complaining that he should have hired Panic! at the Disco. The chimpanzee then texts somebody on his phone, complaining that the band is "wack".  Later, Andy Hurley is replaced by another ape, and when he tries to retrieve his drumsticks, he is thrown out of the studio. In one scene, Pete is shown receiving a phone call from William Beckett of fellow Decaydance band The Academy Is... (it is a cross connection between the video for The Academy Is...'s "We've Got a Big Mess on Our Hands" which shows William making this call to Pete). Other scenes show the band playing the song on a brightly lit stage with the letters "FOB" in the background, and the band's different communications with the chimpanzees. At one point during filming, Pete sits on a bed and attempts to kiss his character's love interest (played by Kim Kardashian), only to have the chimpanzee stop him and show him the correct way to kiss her. Unhappy with the chimpanzee's demands, Pete tries to leave, before Kardashian stops him and the couple kiss, prompting Pete to stay. In the final scene, Pete breaks the choreography. As the chimpanzee angrily complains about his behavior and calls him a "prima donna" (a reference to Fall Out Boy's earlier single, "This Ain't a Scene, It's an Arms Race") and begins caressing Kim, Pete smashes his bass guitar into the "B" from the "FOB" lights on the back wall, then leaves the stage. The "B" falls off leaving "FO". The video was directed by Alan Ferguson.

The "FOB" lights on the back wall of the video can be seen floating on the water in the music video for Fall Out Boy's "What a Catch, Donnie".

In 2018 Fall Out Boy released a music video for "Bishops Knife Trick", the tenth track off their 2018 album Mania, which heavily parodies "Thnks fr th Mmrs".

Track listing
Lyrics written by bassist/backing vocalist Pete Wentz; music composed by Fall Out Boy.

Yellow vinyl
 "Thnks fr th Mmrs"
 "Our Lawyers Made Us Change the Name of This Song So We Wouldn't Get Sued" (live from Hammersmith)

US CD
 "Lindbergh Palace Remix" – 7:53
 "Thnks fr th Mmrs" (album version) – 3:23

Promo
 "Thnks fr th Mmrs"

The Remixes (CD and Masterbeat.com)
 "Thnks fr th Mmrs" (The Lindbergh Palace Radio Edit) – 3:53
 "Thnks fr th Mmrs" (Lenny B Short Term Memory) – 3:51
 "Thnks fr th Mmrs" (Lenny B Radio Edit) – 5:11
 "Thnks fr th Mmrs" (The Lindbergh Palace Remix) – 7:50
 "Thnks fr th Mmrs" (The Lindbergh Palace Remix with DJ Intro) – 7:14
 "Thnks fr th Mmrs" (Lenny B Long Term Memory) – 6:37
 "Thnks fr th Mmrs" (Lenny B Club Remix) – 8:25
 "Thnks fr th Mmrs" (The Lindbergh Palace Dub) – 6:37

Charts and certifications

Weekly charts

Year-end charts

Certifications

References

2007 singles
2007 songs
Fall Out Boy songs
Island Records singles
Song recordings produced by Babyface (musician)
Songs about nostalgia
Songs written by Patrick Stump
Songs written by Pete Wentz
Music videos directed by Alan Ferguson (director)